Lars Werdelin (born 1955) is a Swedish paleontologist specializing in the evolution of mammalian carnivores. One area of interest has been the evolutionary interaction of carnivores and hominins in Africa.

He received his Ph.D. from Stockholm University in 1981.

References

Swedish paleontologists
Stockholm University alumni
1955 births
Living people
Place of birth missing (living people)
Date of birth missing (living people)